Third Time Lucky is a 1931 British comedy film directed by Walter Forde and starring Bobby Howes, Dorothy Boyd and Gordon Harker. It was made at Islington Studios and based on the 1929 West End play of the same title by Arnold Ridley. The film's sets were designed by art director Walter Murton.

Premise
A young country vicar is spurred into action to protect his young ward, when she is blackmailed.

Main cast
 Bobby Howes as Rev. Arthur Fear
 Dorothy Boyd as Jennifer Elling
 Gordon Harker as Bill Meggitt
 Henry Mollison as Stanley Crofts
 Garry Marsh as Capt. Adrian Crowther
 Margaret Yarde as Mrs. Clutterbuck
 Harry Terry as Gregg
 Marie Ault as Mrs. Midge
 Clare Greet as Mrs. Scratton
 Matthew Boulton as Inspector

References

Bibliography
Wood, Linda. British Films, 1927–1939. British Film Institute, 1986.

External links

1931 films
1931 comedy films
Films directed by Walter Forde
British comedy films
Films set in England
Films set in London
Islington Studios films
Gainsborough Pictures films
British films based on plays
British black-and-white films
1930s English-language films
1930s British films